Carpostalagma signata is a moth of the subfamily Arctiinae. It was described by George Talbot in 1932. It is found in Zambia.

References

Endemic fauna of Zambia
Arctiini
Moths described in 1932
Fauna of Zambia
Moths of Africa